Isocoproporphyrin is a tetrapyrrole.

See also
 Porphyria cutanea tarda

Tetrapyrroles